Matías Daniel Garavano (born 24 August 1984) is an Argentine footballer that currently plays as goalkeeper.

External links
 
 

1984 births
Living people
Argentine footballers
Argentine expatriate footballers
Juventud de Las Piedras players
Rampla Juniors players
Mérida UD footballers
Nacional Potosí players
Puerto Montt footballers
A.S.D. Gallipoli Football 1909 players
CD Atlético Baleares footballers
Club Atlético Los Andes footballers
Club Atlético Douglas Haig players
Instituto footballers
Flandria footballers
Chilean Primera División players
Serie B players
Bolivian Primera División players
Primera Nacional players
Primera B Metropolitana players
Segunda División B players
Argentine expatriate sportspeople in Chile
Argentine expatriate sportspeople in Uruguay
Argentine expatriate sportspeople in Bolivia
Argentine expatriate sportspeople in Italy
Argentine expatriate sportspeople in Spain
Expatriate footballers in Chile
Expatriate footballers in Uruguay
Expatriate footballers in Bolivia
Expatriate footballers in Italy
Expatriate footballers in Spain
Association football midfielders
Footballers from Buenos Aires